Reedmergnerite is a borosilicate mineral named in honor of Frank S. Reed and John L. Mergner. It is approved by the International Mineralogical Association but was first described prior to the association's formation, first published in 1955. Although it is approved, it got grandfathered, meaning the name reedmergnerite is still believed to refer to a valid species. Reedmergnerite has a synthetic potassium analogue.

Properties 
Reedmergnerite is a member of the feldspar group. It grows along bedding laminations as authigenic crystals, as a stubby prismatic to platy crystals. It is wedge-shaped usually, and it may have jagged terminations. Crystals grow in aggregates, and a singular crystal's size can reach up to 10 cm. It is isostructural with low albite. It doesn't exhibit anisotropy. The mineral has been synthesized using gels. The procedure occurred hydrothermally. The gels that were used in the synthesis contained a 10% weight excess of silicon dioxide. While the pressure and the temperature were constant, the degree of boron and silicon order increased with time, though both lower water content and pressure decrease the rate of ordering. The mineral's ordering behavior occurs to be insensitive to the co-existing fluid's composition.

Environment and mining 
Although it has three type localities, the most important of those is at Joseph Smith No. 1 well in the United States. The associated minerals at the type locality are eitelite, searlesite, crocidolite, leucosphenite and shortite. It happens to occur in dolomitic shale mostly. However, it can also occur in brown dolomitic rock and black oil shale as well.

References

Triclinic minerals
Borosilicates